Eudes Pedro dos Santos (born 19 July 1966) is a Brazilian football manager.

Career
Born in Recife, Pernambuco, Eudes started his career with Santa Cruz in 1996, as a fitness coach. In 1998 he joined Atlético Paranaense under the same role, but left in 2002 to work as Mário Sérgio's assistant at São Caetano.

Eudes returned to Furacão in 2003, also as Mário Sérgio's assistant, but was relieved of his duties in September of that year. On 24 December, he joined Coritiba to work as an assistant of Antônio Lopes.

Eudes started working with Cuca in 2005, also as an assistant. In 2019, after being released by Santos, he opted not to join Cuca's staff at São Paulo in order to achieve a managerial license.

On 27 August 2019, Eudes was named manager of Remo. On 15 October, after only four matches, he was sacked.

In February 2020, Eudes took over Perilima. He left the club at the end of the 2020 Campeonato Paraibano, but reached an agreement with the board to return as manager for the 2021 campaign.

Eudes returned to Santos on 20 August 2020, also as Cuca's assistant. On 10 November, it was announced that he had tested positive for COVID-19.

Managerial statistics

References

External links

1966 births
Living people
Sportspeople from Recife
Santos FC non-playing staff
Brazilian football managers
Clube do Remo managers